Lethbridge City was a provincial electoral district in Alberta, Canada, mandated to return a single member to the Legislative Assembly of Alberta using the first-past-the-post method of voting from 1909 to 1921.

History
The Lethbridge City electoral district was created after the Lethbridge electoral district was split into the Lethbridge District and Lethbridge City electoral district in 1909.

Lethbridge district was all the rural area surrounding the City of Lethbridge, which in 1913, was split into Little Bow and Taber.

After Lethbridge District was dissolved there was no need to differentiate itself, and thus "City" was dropped in 1921 and Lethbridge was re-formed.

Election results

1909 general election

1911 by-election

1913 general election

1917 general election

By-Election Reasons
October 31, 1911 —Resignation of Mr. William Buchanan to run for House for Commons.

Floor crossings
John Stewart became an Independent and ran for Re-election as an Independent in Lethbridge date not available

See also
List of Alberta provincial electoral districts
Lethbridge, Alberta, a city in Alberta, Canada

References

Further reading

External links
Elections Alberta
The Legislative Assembly of Alberta

Former provincial electoral districts of Alberta
Politics of Lethbridge